Kuterevo is a village in Otočac municipality in Lika-Senj County, Croatia.

Bear sanctuary
There is a bear sanctuary located in the village, which is a popular destination for tourists. The refuge cares for brown bears who have been separated from their mothers, and therefore lack the skills to survive on their own. It is open to visitors year round.

Other attractions
The first church in Kuterevo was built in 1707 and The Church of Our Lady of Mount Carmel was built in 1724.

References

Populated places in Lika-Senj County